Dastjerdeh-ye Sofla (also Romanized as Dastjerdeh-ye Soflá; also known as Dastjerd-e Soflá) is a village in Dinavar Rural District, Dinavar District, Sahneh County, Kermanshah Province, Iran. At the 2006 census, its population was 371, in 84 families.

References 

Populated places in Sahneh County